The Wishful Thinkers is a 2013 Spanish independent film directed and written by Jonás Trueba. It is shot in black and white. The cast features Francesco Carril, Aura Garrido, Vito Sanz, Mikele Urroz, Isabelle Stoffel, and Luis Miguel Madrid.

Plot 
The plot follows the experiences of a group of film lovers living in Madrid.

Cast

Production 
Footage for the film was shot from November 2011 to June 2012. The film was shot in Madrid in black and white and 16 mm. The Madrid's Plaza Mayor features in the film.

Release 
The film premiered on 12 April 2013. It did not have a conventional theatrical release, but it was self-distributed, with screenings in specialised theatres and film archives, in presence of the director.

Reception 
Jonathan Holland of The Hollywood Reporter summed up the film in a bottom line as "an engaging, free-rolling and faux-shambolic 16mm homage to lives lived for film far beyond the outer reaches of the film industry".

Jordi Costa of Fotogramas rated the film 3 out of 5 stars, praising its stylistic bet as an standout while warning that the film's self-absorbed nature may work against it.

Andrea G. Bermejo of Cinemanía rated it 4½ out of 5 stars, concluding that Trueba found his own Antoine Doinel in Francesco Carril.

Jordi Costa of El País, considered that Trueba advances his discourse and manners in relation to his debut film, yet [the director] essentially remains the same, also underscoring that he "has not made a film: he has gone out to look for one and what he has found is valuable".

Accolades 

|-
| align = "center" rowspan = "4" | 2013 || 15th  Buenos Aires International Festival of Independent Cinema || Best Actor || Francesco Carril ||  || 
|-
| rowspan = "3" | 16th Toulouse Spanish Film Festival || colspan = "2" | Golden Violet ||  || rowspan = "3" | 
|-
| Best Actor || Francesco Carril || 
|-
| Best Original Score || Abel Hernández || 
|}

See also 
 List of Spanish films of 2013

References 

Films set in Madrid
Films shot in Madrid
2010s Spanish-language films
2010s Spanish films
Spanish black-and-white films
Self-reflexive films
Spanish independent films
2013 independent films